This is a list of episodes for the television series Sir Arthur Conan Doyle's The Lost World.

Series overview

Episodes

Season 1 (1999–2000)
Source:

Season 2 (2000–2001)
Source:

Season 3 (2001–2002)
Source:

References

Lists of American fantasy television series episodes
Lists of Australian drama television series episodes